Big Creek Township is a township in Henry County, in the U.S. state of Missouri.

Big Creek Township takes its name from Big Creek.

References

Townships in Missouri
Townships in Henry County, Missouri